Sulan Jayawardene (born 20 October 1985) is a Sri Lankan cricketer. He made his first-class debut for Sri Lanka Army Sports Club in the 2008–09 Premier Trophy on 9 January 2009.

References

External links
 

1985 births
Living people
Sri Lankan cricketers
Sri Lanka Army Sports Club cricketers